Cannabis in Taiwan is illegal. It is listed as a category 2 narcotic by Narcotics Hazard Prevention Act in Taiwan. Offenders of manufacturing, transporting, or selling category 2 narcotics are subject to life imprisonment or a minimum 10-year fixed-term imprisonment, and may also be subject to a fine of no more than NT$15 million.

References

Taiwan
Politics of Taiwan
Society of Taiwan